Arabs in Berlin form the fourth-largest ethnic minority group in Berlin, after the Turkish, Polish and Russian community. As of December 2017, there are about 135,000 people of any Arab origin residing in the city, which corresponds to 3.5% of the population.

History
Most Arabs came to Germany in the 1970s, partly as Gastarbeiter from Morocco, the Turkish Province of Mardin (see: Arabs in Turkey) and Tunisia. However, the majority of Arabs in Berlin are refugees of the conflicts in the Middle East, e.g. the Lebanon Wars, Palestinian exodus, the recent Iraq War, Libyan Civil War and Syrian Civil War. The Arabs in Berlin are not a homogeneous group because they originate from about 20 countries.

Distribution
Similar to the Turkish community, Arab people are primarily concentrated in the inner-city boroughs of former West Berlin.

In the case of Neukölln, 80% of Arabs live in the same-named locality of Neukölln, forming up to 10% of the populace. Around 35,000 are of Palestinian and 15,000 of Lebanese origin. The rest of 20,000 are mostly of Moroccan, Iraqi, Algerian, Egyptian, Tunisian, Libyan and Syrian origin.

See also
Arab diaspora
Arabs in Germany
Arabs in Europe
Lebanese diaspora
Syrian diaspora
Palestinian diaspora
Moroccan diaspora
Iraqi diaspora
Egyptian diaspora

References

Arabs in Germany
Ethnic groups in Berlin
Middle Eastern diaspora in Germany